Donator is a Croatian film directed by Veljko Bulajić. It was released in 1989.

External links
 

1989 films
1980s Croatian-language films
Films directed by Veljko Bulajić
Yugoslav drama films
Croatian biographical drama films
1980s biographical drama films